Brachyplatystoma juruense, the zebra catfish, is a species of catfish of the family Pimelodidae that is native to Amazon and Orinoco River basin of Peri and Rio Juruá, northwestern Brazil.

It grows to a length of 60.0 cm. The fish inhabits larger, deeper river channels with a sandy substrate with some large chunks of driftwood.

Adult have broad dark vertical, oblique or branching bands. Ventrum is pale yellowish. Caudal fin blotched or barred. The juvenile form is sometimes confused with B. tigrinum.

It is entirely piscivorous preying on loricariids and other bottom-dwelling fish.

References

Pimelodidae
Catfish of South America
Freshwater fish of Brazil
Taxa named by George Albert Boulenger 
Fish described in 1898